Killiniq Island (English: ice floes) is a remote island in southeastern Nunavut and northern Newfoundland and Labrador, Canada. Located at the extreme northern tip of Labrador between Ungava Bay and the Labrador Sea, it is notable in that it contains the only land border between Nunavut and Newfoundland and Labrador. Most other islands off the northern coast of Quebec and Labrador belong exclusively to Nunavut. Some cartographic sources do not correctly show the island's geopolitical boundaries; for instance, the  seems to show it as belonging to Quebec (an apparent consequence of the province's longstanding boundary dispute with Labrador).

The northernmost point of Newfoundland and Labrador is Cape Chidley on the island. The largest identifiable land mass is the Torngat Mountains, part of the Arctic Cordillera, which proceed from the north to the south of the island.

A former community, meteorological station, Canadian Coast Guard radio station, trading post, missionary post, fishing station, and Royal Canadian Mounted Police post existed until 1978, when it was evacuated by the government of the Northwest Territories. The settlement, also called Killiniq (alternate spelling: Killinek; also known as Port Burwell; local variants: Killipaartalik or Kikkertaujak; previously: Bishop Jones' Village) was on what is now the Nunavut side of the island, part of the territory's Qikiqtaaluk Region. The locality was known by Europeans as early as 1569, marked on a Mercator map.

The island is now uninhabited, but an automated remote radio transmitter for Iqaluit Coast Guard Radio remains in operation.

References

Islands of Newfoundland and Labrador
Uninhabited islands of Qikiqtaaluk Region
Islands of the Labrador Sea
Borders of Nunavut
Borders of Newfoundland and Labrador
Former populated places in the Qikiqtaaluk Region